Trenton and Mercer County War Memorial-Soldiers' and Sailors' Memorial Building, known as the Trenton War Memorial, is located in Trenton, Mercer County, New Jersey, United States. The building was built in 1930 and was added to the National Register of Historic Places on December 11, 1986. It was designed by Louis S. Kaplan (1896-1964), who as a young architect won a competition to design Trenton's memorial to its Dead from World War One. Kaplan then supervised the building of the War Memorial, and after its dedication became the leading architect in Trenton until the early 1960s. Built as a concert hall, it fell into disrepair before being restored by the State of New Jersey in the 1990s. It was rededicated in 1999.  The 1,807-seat theater at the War Memorial was renamed the Patriots Theater in 2001.

See also
National Register of Historic Places listings in Mercer County, New Jersey

References

Renaissance Revival architecture in New Jersey
Art Deco architecture in New Jersey
Theatres completed in 1930
Buildings and structures in Trenton, New Jersey
Theatres in New Jersey
Theatres on the National Register of Historic Places in New Jersey
Monuments and memorials on the National Register of Historic Places in New Jersey
National Register of Historic Places in Trenton, New Jersey
Music venues in New Jersey
New Jersey Register of Historic Places